Our Lady Queen of Peace Cathedral, also known as Broome Cathedral, is the main place of Catholic worship in the city of Broome, Western Australia and the seat of the Bishop of the Diocese of Broome.

In 1899 in the site was built a wooden church dedicated to Our Lady of Peace, with the help of the Philippine pearl divers. Later, the tower and other modifications were completed in April 1904.

In early 1960, the old church of wood and iron needs repairs. The poor state of the church, combined with the fact that the building was too small for the growing community of faithful, led to the decision to build a new church for the town.

Stan Costello, originally from Perth, was commissioned to design the new church of Broome. Construction of the building, adjacent to the site of the old church, began in April 1963 and was completed in September of the same year.

See also
Roman Catholicism in Australia

References

External links

Roman Catholic cathedrals in Western Australia
Buildings and structures in Broome, Western Australia
Roman Catholic churches completed in 1963
20th-century Roman Catholic church buildings in Australia